The 1962 Yale Bulldogs football team represented Yale University in the 1962 NCAA University Division football season.  The Bulldogs were led by 11th-year head coach Jordan Olivar, played their home games at the Yale Bowl and finished seventh in the Ivy League with a 1–5–1 record, 2–5–2 overall.

Schedule

References

Yale
Yale Bulldogs football seasons
Yale Bulldogs football